Full Sail may refer to:

 Full Sail (Loggins and Messina album), 1973
 Full Sail (Chesapeake album), 1996
 "Full Sail", a song by The Beach Boys from their album L.A. (Light Album)
 Full Sail Brewing Company, Hood River, Oregon, U.S.
 Full Sail University, Winter Park, Florida, U.S.
 Full Sail (Toutes voiles dehors), a volume of the comic-book series Quick & Flupke by Hergé

See also 
 Sail, a surface intended to generate thrust by being placed in a wind
 Sailing, the art of controlling a boat with sails